Lycaste lasioglossa is a species of terrestrial orchid native to Mexico, Honduras, Guatemala and El Salvador.

References

lasioglossa
Orchids of El Salvador
Orchids of Guatemala
Orchids of Honduras
Orchids of Mexico